The typographer was an early typewriter invented by William Austin Burt. Intended to aid in office work, the machine worked by using a lever to press characters onto paper one at a time. Perhaps because of its slow speed, or because there was not yet a wide market for typewriters, it was not a commercial success.

Burt had two versions of his mechanical apparatus. The first was built in a wooden box that could be carried by hand. The second was a large advanced model that was mounted on four legs.  The first working model provided by Burt for his 1829 patent was destroyed in the 1836 Patent Office fire.

History 
Burt conceived the idea of a typing device when he observed office workers overwhelmed with the task of creating official documents in triplicate by hand. He reasoned that a printing machine could relieve many hours of the tedious task by automation. In the 1820s in his blacksmith shop he commenced the development of such an apparatus. His "typographer" constructed to the point of being able to print out a neat letter was patented as number 259 on July 23, 1829.

United States Patent Office documents describe Burt's American machine as "the actual construction of a type writing machine for the first time in any country". It was the first practical typewriting machine ever made in America, although Pellegrino Turri had made one in Italy in 1808. The patent gave Burt the full exclusive rights to his new typewriter machine for 14 years, including vending or selling to others any or all of these rights as he saw fit, signed by President Andrew Jackson.

All "type writing" machines, those that used letters of typeface, were generally given the name "typographer" from Burt's 1829 patent until 1874 by subsequent inventors who improved on Burt's machine. The concept ultimately came to be called a "type-writer" in 1874. The word stayed hyphenated until the 1880s. William Ozmun Wyckoff, president of the New York State Shorthand Reporters' Association in 1886, and founder of the Remington Typewriter Company, publicized the unhyphenated name "typewriter". It became very well known, and the public finally accepted this as one word by 1919. Eventually, Burt's typographer was called a typewriter.

The Board of Electors at the National Shorthand Association of Detroit recognized Burt as a leader among typewriter inventors and one that ensured world-wide recognition of priority of American inventors in the typewriter field. French authors Henri Dupont and C. Senechal described Burt's typographer in great detail in their 1906 book

Patent

It mechanically worked by depressing a rotating lever so that an inked letter made contact with paper. A gauge that was designed in a circular clockwise fashion on the front of the box indicated the number of lines typed on the blank piece of paper that was up to 15 inches in length. The paper was attached to a velvet-like material belt. The belt rotated when the impression lever was depressed.

Four classes of  typewriters had been recognized by the U. S. Patent Office. The first was an index-wheel machine, like that patented by Burt on July 23, 1829. The second was the bar-machine first patented by John B. Fairbanks on September 17, 1850. The third was the plate-machine first patented by Oliver T. Eddy on November 12, 1850. The fourth was the key-wheel machine first patented by John Pratt on August 11, 1868.

A complete working model of Burt's "typographer" was in the model room of the Patent Office from the time of the patent until the Patent Office fire of December 15, 1836. The fire destroyed all the patents and patent models issued from 1790. A competent mechanic can build a working replica of Burt's typographer from his patent description and drawings. Austin Burt, the great grandson of Burt, built a working model in 1892 for the World's Columbian Exposition working from a parchment copy of the original patent (No. 5581X).

The reason Burt built the machine was to speed up his work in official correspondence as a government surveyor. John Pitts Sheldon of the Detroit Free Press, Burt's newspaper editor friend, furnished the typeface letters from the newspaper company in May 1829 for Burt's first typographer to be able to type the first letter ever written on it. The letter was to future president Martin Van Buren then Secretary of State.  Two months later it received an official patent as one of the most unique and useful inventions of the time. It was the first patent for a type writing machine.

Burt built in 1830 a second improved typographer typewriter that resembled a pinball machine because four tapered legs for standing were added to it. Sheldon had taken Burt's "moddle" to the Patent Office in Washington, D.C. on March 9 of that year according to a typewritten letter to his wife of March 13, 1830. The typeface letters for this Patent Office model was obtained from a Mr. White of New York, a typeface founder. Even though a neat-looking letter could be typed on Burt's "typographer", the basic goal to speed up correspondence was not accomplished, as his machine was very slow in typing. Because of this, the machine could not get marketed. Burt lost interest in it and sold his rights to one Cyrus Spalding for $75 on March 17, 1830 with suggested improvements. Ultimately he did not have any further luck in marketing the typewriter.

References

Sources 
  
   
  
 
  
    
 
  

American inventions
Typewriters